The Haiti national under-17 football team represents Haiti in international football at this age level and is controlled by the Fédération Haïtienne de Football (FHF).

Competitive record

FIFA U-17 World Cup

CONCACAF U-17 Championship

Players

Current squad
The following 20 players have been named in the final roster for the 2023 Concacaf Men’s Under-17 Championship held in Guatemala from February 11-26, 2023.

Head coach: Angelo Jean Baptiste

Honours
Major competitions
CONCACAF U-17 Championship
 Third place (1): 2019
 Fourth place (1): 2007

Minor competitions
CFU Under-17 Championship
Winners (2): 2000, 2016
CFU Youth Cup
 Runners-up (1): 2006
 Fourth place (1): 2008

See also
Haiti national football team
Haiti national under-15 football team
Haiti national under-20 football team
Haiti national under-23 football team

References

u17
Haiti